Qaleh Now (also Romanized as Qal`eh Now) is a village in Maskun Rural District, Jebalbarez District, Jiroft County, Kerman Province, Iran. At the 2006 census, its population was 23, in 7 families.

References 

Populated places in Jiroft County